Hanne Halén is a Norwegian handball player. She played 13 matches for the Norway women's national handball team between 2001 and 2004. Halén won a silver medal with the Norwegian team at the 2001 World Women's Handball Championship in Italy.

References

Living people
Norwegian female handball players
Year of birth missing (living people)
21st-century Norwegian women